Trenel is a department of the province of La Pampa (Argentina).

References 

Departments of La Pampa Province